The 2011–12 season was Villarreal Club de Fútbol's 89th season in existence and the club's 12th consecutive season in the top flight of Spanish football. It covered a period from 1 July 2011 to 30 June 2012.

Villarreal competed in La Liga and participated in the UEFA Champions League, entering in the play-off round due to their fourth-place finish in the 2010–11 La Liga. They entered the Copa del Rey in the Round of 32. This season would end Villarreal's streak in La Liga; on the final day of the season they lost 1–0 to Atlético Madrid, sending them down to 18th and relegating the side to the second division for the first time since the 1999–2000 season.

Players

Squad information

The numbers are established according to the official website:www.villarrealcf.es and www.lfp.es

Transfers

In

Out

Statistics

Club

Coaching staff

Pre-season and friendlies

Competitions

Overall record

La Liga

League table

Results summary

Results by round

Matches

Copa del Rey

Round of 32

UEFA Champions League

Play-off round

Group stage

Times up to 29 October 2011 (matchdays 1–3) are CEST (UTC+02:00), thereafter (matchdays 4–6) times are CET (UTC+01:00).

See also
2011–12 Copa del Rey
2011–12 La Liga
2011–12 UEFA Champions League

Notes and references

External links
 

Villarreal
Villarreal CF seasons
Villarreal